Lionel Gendarme (born 20 February 1989) is a Belgian professional footballer who currently plays for Vaux-Noville in the Belgian Provincial Leagues as a left back.

Career
Before joining Oostende, Gendarme played no less than 12 seasons with Standard Liège before enjoying a short spell at Levante. In the beginning of 2011, he was signed by OH Leuven as a backup player and was part of the team that achieved promotion to the Belgian Pro League in 2011. Not receiving much playing time in the first division, Gendarme chose to move to Oostende following the 2011-12 season. In June 2013 it was announced he had signed at Union Saint-Gilloise for one year.

References

External links

Lionel Gendarme at Footballdatabase

1989 births
Living people
Belgian footballers
Belgium youth international footballers
Belgian Pro League players
Challenger Pro League players
RFC Liège players
Standard Liège players
Levante UD footballers
Oud-Heverlee Leuven players
K.V. Oostende players
Royale Union Saint-Gilloise players
People from Wilrijk

Association football defenders